The Humber Street Gallery is an art gallery in the English city of Kingston upon Hull. The three-storey gallery was opened in February 2017 as part of that year's Hull UK City of Culture event, with exhibitions by the COUM Transmissions collective and Sarah Lucas. Curator David Sinclair describes the gallery as being "the new home of the sort of art that Hull inspires".

The gallery's cafe includes the local "Dead Bod" graffiti, relocated from its original site on a corrugated iron shed on Riverside Wharf. The artwork is a human-sized depiction of a dead bird, supposedly painted by Captain Len ‘Pongo’ Rood and Chief Engineer Gordon Mason in the 1960s, and was a prominent feature on the city's docks.

The Humber Street Gallery is located in a former fruit and vegetable warehouse in Hull's Fruit Market district.

References

External links
Humber Street Gallery

Art museums and galleries in the East Riding of Yorkshire
Art galleries established in 2017
2017 establishments in England